Dorcadion corcyricum is a species of longhorn beetle in the family Cerambycidae. It was described by Ludwig Ganglbauer in 1883. It is found in Greece.

References

corcyricum
Beetles described in 1883